The City University test (also known as TCU test or CU test) is a color vision test used to detect color vision deficiency. The commonly used Ishihara test is used to detect mainly congenital red-green color blindness, but its usefulness is limited in detecting acquired color vision deficiencies. The City University Test contains plates can be used to detect all types of color vision deficiencies.  The TCU test was derived from Farnsworth D15 color arrangement test. The test consists of 10 plates, containing a central colored dot surrounded by four peripheral dots of different colors. The subject is asked to choose the dot closest to the central hue. Among the four peripheral dots, three peripheral colors are designed in such a way that, it makes confusion with the central color in protan, deutran and tritan deficiency. The fourth color is an adjacent color in D-15 sequence and that would be most similar to the central color.

Procedure
In a well illuminated room, hold the test plates at about 35 cm from patient. Show the test plates and ask the patient to mention which dot is identical to central dot. Allow about 3 seconds for each page. In response to the scores noted in score sheet abnormality can be detected.

See also
 Color vision
 Color vision deficiency

Reference

Color vision
Diagnostic ophthalmology
Optometry